Patricia du Roy de Blicquy (born 7 October 1943) is a Belgian alpine skier. She competed in three events at the 1964 Winter Olympics.

References

1943 births
Living people
Belgian female alpine skiers
Olympic alpine skiers of Belgium
Alpine skiers at the 1964 Winter Olympics
Sportspeople from Brussels